Events from the year 1427 in France

Incumbents
 Monarch – Charles VII

Events
 Unknown - Gilles de Rais is appointed commander of the French Armies during the Hundred Years War

Births
 29 May - Françoise d'Amboise, saint (died 1485)

Deaths
 17 April - John IV, Duke of Brabant (born 1403)
 Unknown - Amaury de Sévérac, soldier

References

1420s in France